Take It Away may refer to:

Take It Away, song by Karmin
 "Take It Away" (Paul McCartney song), song by Paul McCartney from his 1982 album Tug of War
 "Take It Away" (The Used song), song by The Used from their 2004 album In Love and Death
"Take It Away", song by Raven from their 1983 album All for One
"Take It Away", song by The Butterfly Effect from their 2001 EP The Butterfly Effect EP
Take it Away!, a 1968 Buddy Rich big band album (aka The New One!)